Melinda Haynes (born 1955) is an American novelist. She grew up in Hattiesburg, Mississippi. For much of her adult life she was a painter. In 1999, she wrote her first published novel, Mother of Pearl, while living in a mobile home in Grand Bay, Alabama. Melinda Haynes currently resides in Mobile, Alabama with her husband, Ray. Her writing has a close relationship to Mississippi in the 1950s and 1960s.

Works 
In June 1999, Haynes' first novel, Mother of Pearl (1999, hardcover) was chosen to be a member of Oprah's Book Club. The novel also was a New York Times''' Best Seller.

Her second novel Chalktown (May 2, 2001, hardcover) was published by Hyperion Books in Hardback (317 pp) and Paperback (368 pp).

Haynes's third book is titled, Willem's Field'' (2003). Willem's Field is a 432-page print hardback and paperback book.

References

External links 
  Melinda Haynes at The Mississippi Writers and Musicians Project of Starkville High School

1955 births
Living people
20th-century American novelists
21st-century American novelists
American women novelists
20th-century American women writers
21st-century American women writers
People from Hattiesburg, Mississippi
People from Grand Bay, Alabama
Writers from Mobile, Alabama
Novelists from Alabama